Sri Lanka Tamils could mean

 Sri Lankan Tamil people, Tamils who are native to the island
 Sri Lankan Tamil dialects, unique Tamil-language dialects used in Sri Lanka by native Sri Lankan Tamil population and in the Sri Lankan Tamil diaspora